The Hooper House is a historic house located in Swansea, Massachusetts.

Description and history 
The -story, gambrel-roofed, wood-framed house was built in about 1790, and is located on what was once a major route from the Gardner's Neck area to Rehoboth. It is a well-preserved example of a 19th-century farmhouse.  The main facade is five bays wide, with a recessed center entrance flanked by sidelights and pilasters, and topped by an entablature. The property includes an early two-car garage (c. 1920s), an 1890 barn, and a stone wellhouse (c. 1920).

The house was listed on the National Register of Historic Places on August 8, 1990.

See also
National Register of Historic Places listings in Bristol County, Massachusetts

References

Houses in Bristol County, Massachusetts
Swansea, Massachusetts
Houses on the National Register of Historic Places in Bristol County, Massachusetts
Federal architecture in Massachusetts